Carolijn Mariëlle Brouwer (born 25 July 1973, in Leiden) is a sailor from the Netherlands, who represented this country for the first time at the 2000 Summer Olympics  in Sydney. Brouwer as helmsman of the Dutch with Alexandra Verbeek as crew took the 13th place in the Women's 470. In the 2004 Olympics Brouwer returned to the Olympics in Europe and took 19th place. Brouwer than switched to the Tornado and qualified for the 2008 Olympics. However this time she sailed for Belgium. As helmsman, with crew Sébastien Godefroid she took 12th place.

She received the ISAF World Sailor of the Year Award in 1998 and 2018.

Brouwer was crewmember in three Volvo Ocean Races:
 Amer Sports Too in 2001–02 (8th edition)
 Team SCA in 2014–15 (12th edition)
 Dongfeng Race Team in 2017–18 (13th edition)

Brouwer is owner of ''2B Sailing (2010–Present).

References

External links
 
 
 

 
 
 
 

1973 births
Living people
Dutch female sailors (sport)
Belgian female sailors (sport)
Sailors at the 2000 Summer Olympics – 470
Sailors at the 2004 Summer Olympics – Europe
Sailors at the 2008 Summer Olympics – Tornado
Olympic sailors of the Netherlands
Olympic sailors of Belgium
Sportspeople from Leiden
ISAF World Sailor of the Year (female)
Volvo Ocean Race sailors
Europe class world champions
World champions in sailing for the Netherlands